|}

The Prix Maurice de Gheest is a Group 1 flat horse race in France open to thoroughbreds aged three years or older. It is run at Deauville over a distance of 1,300 metres (about 6½ furlongs), and it is scheduled to take place each year in August.

History
The event was established in 1922, and it was originally contested over 1,400 metres. It was named in memory of Maurice de Gheest (1850–1920), a member of the Société des Courses de Deauville, a former governing body at the venue.

Deauville Racecourse was closed during World War II, and the Prix Maurice de Gheest was cancelled in 1940. For the remainder of this period it was switched between Maisons-Laffitte (1941–43, 1945) and Auteuil (1944). It returned to Deauville in 1946, and it was cut to 1,300 metres in 1966.

The present system of race grading was introduced in 1971, and the Prix Maurice de Gheest was initially classed at Group 3 level. It was promoted to Group 2 status in 1980, and to the highest level, Group 1, in 1995.

The Prix Maurice de Gheest was included in the Turf Sprint division of the Breeders' Cup Challenge series in 2009, but it was removed from the series the following year.

The race was sponsored by Wertheimer et Frère in 2011, and its title featured the name of Goldikova, a successful mare owned and bred by the Wertheimers.

The race has been sponsored since 2013 by LARC, Latin American Racing Channel broadcasting South American races to Europe, United States, Australia and Turkey, since 2006.

Records
Most successful horse (3 wins):
 Marchand d'Or – 2006, 2007, 2008
 Moonlight Cloud - 2011, 2012, 2013

Leading jockey (4 wins):
 Lester Piggott – Mountain Call (1968), Abergwaun (1972), Moorestyle (1981), College Chapel (1993)
 Gérald Mossé - Cricket Ball (1989), Dolphin Street (1994), May Ball (2002), Garswood (2014)

Leading trainer (7 wins):
 Freddy Head – Marchand d'Or (2006, 2007, 2008), Moonlight Cloud (2011, 2012, 2013), Polydream (2018)

Leading owner (4 wins):
 Marcel Boussac – Zariba (1922), Grillemont (1923), Theano (1943), Windorah (1947)
 Pierre Wertheimer – Sonny Boy (1933), Djanet (1956), Midget (1957), Tomahawk (1959)

Winners since 1979

Earlier winners

 1922: Zariba
 1923: Grillemont
 1924: Persephone
 1925: Lezignan
 1926: Nyo
 1927: Mordicus
 1928: Galopin
 1929: Tivoli
 1930: Advertencia
 1931: Masked Jester
 1932: Ziani
 1933: Sonny Boy
 1934: Jocrisse
 1935: Master Vere
 1936: Aziyade
 1937: Aziyade
 1938: Sweet Dream
 1939: Le Koh-i-Noor
 1940: no race
 1941: Becassin
 1942: Galene
 1943: Theano
 1944: Le Volcan
 1945:
 1946: Tango
 1947: Windorah
 1948: Drakkar
 1949: Djebe
 1950: Skylarking
 1951:
 1952: Guam
 1953: Vamarie
 1954: Vamarie
 1955:
 1956: Djanet
 1957: Midget
 1958: Val d'Oisans
 1959: Tomahawk
 1960: Rina
 1961: Nice Guy
 1962: Nice Guy
 1963: Tryptic
 1964: Spy Well
 1965: Yours
 1966: Han d'Island
 1967: Radames
 1968: Mountain Call
 1969: Quebracho
 1970: Irish Minstrel
 1971: Sweet Revenge
 1972: Abergwaun
 1973: Pepenador

See also
 List of French flat horse races

References

 France Galop / Racing Post:
 galop.courses-france.com:
 1922–1949, 1950–1979, 1980–present

 france-galop.com – A Brief History: Prix Maurice de Gheest.
 galopp-sieger.de – Prix Maurice de Gheest.
 horseracingintfed.com – International Federation of Horseracing Authorities – Prix Maurice de Gheest (2017).
 pedigreequery.com – Prix Maurice de Gheest – Deauville.

Open sprint category horse races
Deauville-La Touques Racecourse
Horse races in France
Recurring sporting events established in 1922
1922 establishments in France